John Scherrenburg (born October 23, 1963 in Ede) is a retired water polo player from the Netherlands. He finished in ninth position with the Dutch team at the 1992 Summer Olympics in Barcelona.

References

External links
 

1963 births
Living people
Dutch male water polo players
Olympic water polo players of the Netherlands
Water polo players at the 1992 Summer Olympics
People from Ede, Netherlands
Sportspeople from Gelderland
20th-century Dutch people